Ari Millen (born January 19, 1982) is a Canadian actor. He is best known for his performance as numerous clones in the Space and BBC America science fiction television series Orphan Black (2014–2017), for which he won a Canadian Screen Award in 2016.

Early life
Millen was born in Kingston, Ontario. As a child he aspired to play in the National Hockey League until, at the age of 17, a friend offered him a part in a small play and he decided to pursue performing arts instead. In secondary school at Kingston Collegiate and Vocational Institute, he spent his Ontario Academic Credit year studying theatre. He subsequently attended Ryerson University's Theatre School and graduated in 2007 with a Bachelor of Fine Arts.

Career
Millen signed with a talent agency in his fourth year of university, and one of his first roles was in a 2008 episode of the television series ReGenesis. In September 2008 he appeared in a Halifax production of Vern Thiessen's play Vimy, and in December 2008 he was cast in The Veil, a play written by Shahin Sayadi. The Veil opened in Halifax before relocating to Iran in January 2009, where the play was featured in Tehran's Fajr International Theater Festival. From 2010 to 2013, Millen appeared in a variety of small roles in the television series Nikita, Rookie Blue and State of Syn, as well as the horror films Monster Brawl and Exit Humanity.

In August 2013 he successfully auditioned for a role on the second season of the science fiction series Orphan Black, after two unsuccessful auditions during the show's first season. It was announced in October 2013 that he had got the role of Mark. He spent six months filming Orphan Black second season, which aired in 2014, and returned for the third season in 2015. He was upgraded to the main cast in roles depicting the various Castor clones. At PaleyFest on October 18, 2015, it was confirmed that Millen would be returning for season four. 
He made a guest appearance in Reign in 2014.

In 2016, Millen won a Canadian Screen Award for his work on Orphan Black.

Filmography

Film

Television

References

External links

Living people
21st-century Canadian male actors
Canadian male film actors
Canadian male stage actors
Canadian male television actors
Male actors from Kingston, Ontario
Toronto Metropolitan University alumni
1982 births
Best Actor in a Drama Series Canadian Screen Award winners